Fashion Malawi Edition or "F.A.M.E" is the first organization in Malawi that works to market and develop the Malawian fashion Industry through capacity building and professional development training. It was founded in 2010 by Zilanie Gondwe Nyundo and Inge Knapen to build a fashion in industry in Malawi after identifying voids in a previously underdeveloped industry. They are Malawi's leading fashion organization and a pioneer in Malawi's fashion industry. They regularly host national fashion shows in Malawi that have received public acclaim. This includes the Kia Malawi Fashion Show. They are credited for creating an industry which created space for fashion related businesses to grow in Malawi. They are credited for launching the career of fashion designer Lily Alfonso. In November 2012, they announced that they will host Malawi's first " Malawi Fashion Week".

Industry and capacity building work
FAME has been supporting the fashion industry at the grassroots level since inception. This includes capacity building in the industry. They are credited for fostering the growth of a fashion industry in Malawi. Malawi has seen the growth of new fashion related businesses since their inception, including modelling agencies, fashion houses, and fashion photography. They also engage in professional development workshops, including the finance training for students to Don Bosco Technical College and Samalani Youth Center. In attempts to grow the industry, they also support and sponsor events by fashion organizations in Malawi.

FAME events
FAME creates a platform where the Malawi fashion industry can showcase their work. There events have attracted local, regional and international talent in its events. local talent has included Tuccie Creations, Memory Chimchere of the Diva Yn label, and Debbie Gadama of Phade label, Manuka Fashions, and Isaac Bukhu of Haus of Gola. International designers have included Peggy 'O' (Kenya) and  Pallade Segapo (South Africa), Mustafa Hassanali (Tanzania), Mehmuna Ibrahim-Schumann (Mali). Fame organized a fashion show as a part of the African Movie Academy Awards nomination gala that took place in Malawi in March 2013.

Malawi Fashion Week
A leader in Malawi's fashion industry, in November 2012, FAME announced that it will host Malawi's first ever Fashion Week in 2013.

FAME Awards
FAME recognizes talent in Malawi by awarding the 'best designer' and 'top model'.

Best Fashion Designer Award winners
Yavinde Nyasulu, 2012
Clemoh Sato, 2011
Lily Alfonso, 2010

Model of the Year Award winners
Micheal Kazembe, 2012
Nomonde Sunshine,2011

Upcoming Designer of the Year Award winners

Tawile Kumsinda, 2015

External links
FAME Website

References

Fashion events in Malawi
Malawian fashion
Fashion organizations
2010 establishments in Malawi
Organizations established in 2010
Business organisations based in Malawi